The Macintosh LC is a personal computer designed, manufactured, and sold by Apple Computer, Inc. from October 1990 to March 1992.

Overview
The first in the Macintosh LC family, the LC was introduced with the Macintosh Classic (a repackaging of the older Macintosh SE) and the Macintosh IIsi (a new entry-level machine for the Macintosh II series), and offered for half the price of the Macintosh II but significantly lesser in performance overall. The creation of the LC was prompted by Apple's desire to produce a product that could be sold to school boards for the same price as an Apple IIGS. It was designed for inexpensive manufacturing, with five major components that robots could assemble. The computer had a $2,400 list price; it and the new $600 12-inch color display were $3,500 less expensive than the Macintosh II. Not long after the Apple IIe Card was introduced for the LC, Apple quietly removed the IIGS from its price list, forceably retiring it, as the company wanted to focus its sales and marketing efforts on the LC.

The original Macintosh LC was introduced in October 1990, with initial shipments to dealers following in December and January.  It was replaced by Macintosh LC II, which was largely the same but was built around a Motorola 68030 processor.

Hardware 

The LC uses a "pizza box" case with a Processor Direct Slot (PDS) but no NuBus slots. It has a 16 MHz Motorola 68020 microprocessor which lacks a floating-point coprocessor (although one could be added via the PDS). The LC has a 16-bit data bus, which is a major performance bottleneck as the 68020 is a 32-bit CPU. The LC's memory management chipset places a limit of 10 MB RAM no matter how much was installed.

The LC shipped with 256 kB of VRAM, supporting a display resolution of 512×384 pixels at 8-bit color. The VRAM is upgradeable to 512 kB, supporting a display resolution of 512×384 pixels at 16-bit color or 640×480 pixels at 8-bit color. The LC was commonly purchased with an Apple 12" RGB monitor which had a fixed resolution of 512×384 pixels and a form factor exactly matching the width of the LC chassis, giving the two together a near all-in-one appearance. An Apple 13" 640×480 Trinitron display was also available, but at a list price of $999, it cost around half as much as the LC itself. Until the introduction of the LC, the lowest resolution supported on color Macs had been 640×480. Many programs written for color Macintosh II family computers had assumed this as a minimum, and some were unusable at the lower resolution. For several years software developers had to add support for this smaller screen resolution in order to guarantee that their software would run on LCs (as well as Color Classics which use the same resolution).

Overall, general performance of the machine was disappointing due to the crippling data bus bottleneck, making it run far slower than the 16 MHz 68020-based Macintosh II from 1987, which had an identical processor but ran almost twice as fast. One difference between the Mac II and the Mac LC is the latter had no socket for a 68851 MMU. Therefore, it could not take advantage of System 7's virtual memory features.

The standard configuration included a floppy drive and a 40 MB or 80 MB hard drive, but a version was available for the education market which had an Apple II card in the PDS slot, two floppy drives, and no hard drive. The LC was the final Macintosh model to allow for dual internal floppy drives. The LC, as with other Macs of the day, featured built-in networking on the serial port using LocalTalk. Ethernet was also available as an option via the single PDS slot. If the single expansion slot was a limitation, multifunction cards were available combining Ethernet functionality with an MMU or FPU socket.

Apple IIe Card

The Apple IIe Card for the PDS slot was offered in a bundle with education models of the LCs. The card allowed the LC to emulate an Apple IIe. The combination of a low-cost color Macintosh with Apple IIe compatibility was intended to encourage the education market to transition from aging Apple II models to the Macintosh platform instead of to the new low-cost IBM PC compatibles. Despite the LC's minimal video specs with a 12" monitor, any LC that supports the card can be switched into 560×384 resolution for better compatibility with the IIe's 280×192 High-Resolution graphics (essentially doubled).

Models 
Introduced October 15, 1990:
 Macintosh LC: 2 MB RAM, 40 MB HDD.

Timeline

References

External links 

 Apple Macintosh LC (Original) Specs at everymac.com.
 Mac LC at lowendmac.com.

 
LC I
LC I
Computer-related introductions in 1990